Notts County were the oldest club in the Football League and the 2009–10 season was their 121st year in The Football League. An unknown Investment company (which falsely claimed it had the backing of Middle Eastern investors) took over Notts County in early June with Sven-Göran Eriksson becoming Director of Football and he left on 12 February. On 12 February, Ray Trew became owner of the club following the Peter Trembling's sale.

Season review

Kits & sponsorship
Notts County change to Nike to design kits, County use the Milan template in County's traditional black & white colours. Medoc sponsors the home Kit. Octavian Society is the sponsor on the basic Nike Template blue away shirt.

Events
14 July 2009 – The fraudulent Munto Finance complete the takeover and named Peter Trembling chairman.
21 July 2009 – Sven-Göran Eriksson was announced as director of football.
7 August 2009 – Notts County sign with Nike and Medoc Computers becomes Shirt sponsor.
25 August 2009 – Former England international Sol Campbell signs on five-year deal.
23 September 2009 – Sol Campbell's contract is cancelled by mutual consent after he walked out.
12 October 2009 – Manager Ian McParland is sacked.
27 October 2009 – Hans Backe is named as manager.
14 November 2009 – Kasper Schmeichel wins League Two Player of the Month.
1 December 2009 – Paul Fearon is appointed as Director of Hospitality, Catering and Events.
10 December 2009 – Munto Finance puts Notts County up for sale.
12 December 2009 – Peter Trembling completes takeover of Notts County from Munto Finance.
15 December 2009 – Hans Backe resigns after just seven-week in charge.
26 January 2010 – Peter Trembling secures investment which will pay off all debt and provide extra funds.
12 February 2010 – Former Lincoln City chairman Ray Trew buys Notts County and director of football, Sven-Göran Eriksson leaves.
23 February 2010 – Steve Cotterill takes over as manager.
1 April 2010 – Notts County sign a two-year sponsorship deal with Lorien Resourcing, the sponsors will be on the back of the first team home shirts.
3 April 2010 – Steve Cotterill wins Manager of the Month for March and Vice-Captain Neal Bishop wins Player of the Month.
17 April 2010 – Notts County unveil new club badge.
17 April 2010 – Notts County are promoted to League One after a 4–1 win over Morecambe.
27 April 2010 – Notts County win the League Two title after a 5–0 win against already relegated Darlington.
1 May 2010 – Steve Cotterill wins his second Football League Two Manager of the Month (April), Lee Hughes wins the April League Two Player of the Month.

League Two
Notts County begin their season with a 5–0 win over Bradford City. This was followed by a win over Macclesfield, scoring nine goals in two games put County top of the League Two table. They suffered their first defeat at Chesterfield but bounced back with a win over Dagenham & Redbridge followed by a loss to Barnet and then a draw against Football League new boys Burton Albion. Notts County continued their promotion hopes with a 5–2 win over Northampton Town, Lee Hughes achieved his 10th career hat-trick. This was followed with a loss to Morecambe and they quickly bounced back when Hughes scored twice and an own goal which gave Notts County in a 3–1 win over Port Vale. Three draws followed these against Cheltenham Town, Torquay United & Rotherham. Crewe Alexandra lost to County with Luke Rodgers and Craig Westcarr scoring the only two goals. This was followed with a 1–1 draw with Shrewsbury Town. Lee Hughes returns on the score sheet in a 3–3 draw with Bury, this was followed with another draw against Aldershot Town. The Magpies then lost 2–1 to Rochdale, following this new manager Hans Backe had his first league win, which was a 4–0 against Darlington. Westcarr and Edwards keep County top of the play-offs with a 2–0 win over Hereford United. After Peter Trembling's take over at County, they lost 2–1 to Accrington, this was County's first home defeat of the season.

County returned to action on 28 December after two games were postponed due to frozen pitches and County beat Burton Albion 4–1. In their first league game of 2010 against Dagenham & Redbridge, County earned all three points with three goals followed by a home win against Barnet. Grimsby Town were then beaten by the Magpies. Their winning streak was ended by a 2–1 loss at A.F.C. Bournemouth, then a draw to strugglers Grimsby. Aldershot Town held County to a 1–1 draw. Notts County then beat relegation battlers Hereford United 5–0. They then climbed to 4th with wins against Macclesfield Town, Accrington Stanley and Chesterfield. A draw with fellow promotion hopefuls A.F.C. Bournemouth put County into the automatic places and then a win against Crewe Alexandra moved them up to 2nd. Which were followed by a draw against Bradford City and wins against Rotherham United, with Rodgers getting the only goal, which earned new manager Steve Cotterill Manager of the Month for March. Fellow promotion hopefuls Bury were beaten 5–0 by Notts County. Ben Davies gave County a 1–0 over The Shrews. Davies scored his third in three games with the only goal against Northampton Town. Notts County edge ever closer to promotion with a 3–1 win over Lincoln City.  Rochdale lost to relegated Darlington putting County top of the table. Notts County were promoted along with Rochdale after a 4–1 win over Morecambe. The next game was at home against Rochdale which County won 1–0. County then on 24 April 2010 lost 2–1 to Port Vale, one more win by county or a loss by Rochdale and Notts are Champions. County clinched the title with a 5–0 win over already relegated Darlington. County beat Cheltenham 5–0 in the final home game of the season. County finished their League Two campaign with a goalless draw with Torquay United.

Pld = Matches played; W = Matches won; D = Matches drawn; L = Matches lost; F = Goals for; A = Goals against; GD = Goal difference; Pts = Points (P) = Promoted

Results summary

Cups

FA Cup
County started their FA Cup campaign against League Two rivals Bradford City. Hawley and Jackson put County through in a 2–1 win. The Magpies were drawn with a trip to A.F.C. Bournemouth for the second round. County put Bournemouth out of the cup with a 2–1 win, the draw for the third round named non-League side Forest Green Rovers to play County at Meadow Lane County then beat Forest Green 2–1 to go through to the next round, County's first fourth round entry in 15 years. Premier League outfit Wigan Athletic held County to a late draw (2–2) resulting in a replay, which County won 2–0. County were then knocked in the fifth round by Premier League side Fulham.

League Cup 
Notts County were knocked out of the first round by Championship outfit Doncaster Rovers.

Football League Trophy 
Notts County were knocked out in the first round by Bradford City, County lost 3–2 on penalties.

Squad

Statistics
Last Update 9 May 2010

|}

 *Indicates player left during the season

Captains

Disciplinary record

Transfers

Summer transfers in

Summer transfers out

 * Indicates the player joined club after being released

Loans in

Loan out

Fixtures & results

League

FA Cup

League Cup

Football League Trophy

Backroom staff

Honours

Team
League Two Champions

Individual
October Football League Two Player of the Month: Kasper Schmeichel
March Football League Two Player of the Month: Neal Bishop
March Football League Two Manager of the Month: Steve Cotterill
April Football League Two Manager of the Month: Steve Cotterill
April Football League Two Player of the Month: Lee Hughes
League Two PFA Team of the Year: Ben Davies, Lee Hughes, Kasper Schmeichel
League Two PFA Fans' Player of the Year: Kasper Schmeichel
Football League Two Golden Boot: Lee Hughes

Club Awards
Player of the Year: Ben Davies
Manager's Player of the Year: Lee Hughes
Player's Player of the Year: Lee Hughes
Golden Boot: Lee Hughes
Goal of the Year: Ben Davies against Bury (3 April 2010)
Youth Manager's Player of the Year: Haydn Hollis
Youth Player's Player of the Year: Haydn Hollis
Most Improved Youth Player: Reiss Neal

See also
Notts County F.C. seasons

References

Notts County F.C. seasons
Notts County